Bader Ahmed al-Mutawa (born 10 January 1985) is a Kuwaiti professional footballer who plays for Qadsia and the Kuwait national team, where he usually operates as a second striker. He wears the jersey number 17 for both club and country.

Club career
Al-Mutawa was born in Kuwait City. His performance for both club and national teams lead to him being nominated for best Asian player in 2006 and 2010, though Al-Mutawa did not win the prize.

He was awarded the Kuwaiti league's top scorer for local players in the 2008–09 season with 10 goals.

On 23 July 2012, he began training with Nottingham Forest as their new owners, the Al-Hasawi family, arranged a one-month trial for the striker. He impressed manager Sean O'Driscoll enough that the club were looking to sign him on a permanent basis but he was denied a work permit and the club wasn't able to sign him.

On 11 May 2021, he scored his 300th goal for Qadsia in all competitions, Including friendly matches, in a 3–1 win over Kuwait SC.

International career
Al-Mutawa's first major competition on international level was the 2003 Arabian Gulf Cup, hosted by Kuwait. The home side finished sixth with only five points from six matches (only Yemen, the newcomer to the Gulf Cup finished the tournament with fewer points, sparing Kuwait the embarrassment of ending up at the bottom of the table of the gulf cup for the first time in their history). Al-Mutwa scored once in Kuwait's only victory of the tournament, a 4–0 win against Yemen.

Al-Mutawa played in the 17th Arabian Gulf Cup in 2004, scoring a goal in the 87th minute against Saudi Arabia in Kuwait's opening match. Al-Mutawa excelled in this tournament, forming a strike partnership with captain and star striker Bashar Abdullah. They managed to score five goals between them. This partnership was short lived as Bashar retired from international football shortly after the tournament and Kuwait was eliminated in the semi-finals by Qatar after topping Group B with two victories and one draw with Bahrain.

At the 18th Arabian Gulf Cup in 2007, Al-Mutawa scored goals against Yemen and in the final group match against the United Arab Emirates, but Kuwait exited the tournament for the first time in their history without winning a single game.

On 3 September 2015, Al-Mutawa scored his second senior hat-trick, in a 9–0 defeat of Myanmar in a 2018 FIFA World Cup qualifier.

FIFA recognizes him as the men's joint all-time record appearance holder with 196 caps, after having surpassed Soh Chin Ann's record of 195 recognized by FIFA matches on 14 June 2022. His record was equalled by Portugal's Cristiano Ronaldo during the 2022 FIFA World Cup.

Personal life 
Al-Mutawa holds the military rank of colonel and he is also director of the Security Affairs Department of the Kuwaiti National Assembly Guard, as sports professionalism is not fully applied in Kuwait.

Career statistics

Club Career Stats

International 

Notes

Honours
Qadsia
 Kuwaiti Premier League: 2003–04, 2004–05, 2008–09, 2009–10, 2010–11, 2011–12, 2013–14, 2015–16
 Kuwait Emir Cup: 2003–04, 2006–07, 2009–10, 2011–12, 2012–13, 2014–15
 Kuwait Crown Prince Cup: 2003–04, 2004–05, 2005–06, 2008–09, 2012–13, 2013–14, 2017–18
 Kuwait Super Cup: 2009, 2011, 2013, 2014, 2018, 2019
 Kuwait Federation Cup: 2008, 2008–09, 2010–11, 2012–13, 2018–19
 Al-Khurafi Cup: 2002–03, 2005–06
 GCC Champions League: 2005
 AFC Cup: 2014; runner-up 2010, 2013

Kuwait
 Arabian Gulf Cup: 2010
 2010 WAFF Championship: 2010

Individual
Arabian Gulf Cup top goalscorer: 2010
IFFHS World's Best International Goal Scorer: 2010
Asian Footballer of the Year nominee: 2006, 2010; longlist: 2007

See also
 List of men's footballers with 100 or more international caps
 List of men's footballers with 50 or more international goals

References

External links
 
 
 Rising Arab stars making their mark at FIFA.com
 
 

1985 births
Living people
Kuwaiti footballers
Kuwait international footballers
Kuwaiti expatriate footballers
Al Nassr FC players
Qadsia SC players
2004 AFC Asian Cup players
2011 AFC Asian Cup players
2015 AFC Asian Cup players
FIFA Century Club
Association football forwards
Footballers at the 2006 Asian Games
Sportspeople from Kuwait City
Asian Games competitors for Kuwait
AFC Cup winning players
Expatriate footballers in Saudi Arabia
Expatriate footballers in Qatar
Kuwaiti expatriate sportspeople in Saudi Arabia
Kuwaiti expatriate sportspeople in Qatar
Qatar SC players
Colonels (military rank)